Thomas Swain Barclay (January 26, 1892 – December 21, 1993) was a professor of political science at Stanford University. He taught five U.S. senators and countless other Stanford University students over three decades.

Barclay was born into a politically active Democratic family in St. Louis, Missouri.

Barclay received A.B. and A.M. degrees in political science from the University of Missouri, a doctorate at Columbia University, and an honorary doctorate of law from the University of Missouri for his accomplishments as a teacher, scholar and student of politics and government. He died at the age of 101 in 1993.

External links
 http://www.stanford.edu/dept/news/pr/94/940103Arc4526.html
 http://shs.umsystem.edu/manuscripts/invent/3938.pdf
 Thomas Swain Barclay Papers
Thomas Swain Barclay: An Oral History, Stanford Historical Society Oral History Program, 1980.

Stanford University Department of Political Science faculty
1892 births
1993 deaths
American centenarians
Men centenarians
Columbia Graduate School of Arts and Sciences alumni
University of Missouri alumni
20th-century political scientists